Cazalet is a surname. Notable people with the surname include:

 Auguste Cazalet (1938–2013), member of the Senate of France
 Sir Edward Cazalet (born 1936), British judge
 Edward Cazalet (merchant) (1827-1883), British merchant and industrialist
 Clement Cazalet (1869–1950), British tennis player
 Hal Cazalet (born 1969), English tenor opera singer
 Lara Cazalet (born 1973), English actress
 Peter Cazalet (1899-1982), English admiral
 Peter Cazalet (racehorse trainer), (1907–73) English cricketer, jockey, racehorse owner and trainer
 Thelma Cazalet-Keir (1899–1989), British feminist and politician (née Cazalet)
 Colonel Victor Cazalet (1896–1943), British politician
 William Marshall Cazalet (1865–1932), British socialite and tennis player

See also
 The Cazalets, a 2001 British television drama series
 Puyol-Cazalet, a commune in the Landes department, Aquitaine, southwest France

Occitan-language surnames